Babson is a surname. Notable people with the surname include:

Frederick Babson, American politician
Henry Babson (1875–1970), American businessman and horse breeder
Janis Babson (1950–1961), Canadian organ transplant donor
Marian Babson, pseudonym of Ruth Stenstreem, British writer
Roger Babson (1875–1967), American businessman
Samuel Babson Fuld (born 1981), American baseball player and general manager